The Columbus Rage were a professional hockey team based in Columbus, Indiana. The team was a part of the Midwest Hockey League and folded before playing a game. The Rage were to play their home games at Hamilton Ice Arena in Columbus.

External links
Official Columbus Rage website
Planned soccer team

Ice hockey teams in Indiana
2008 establishments in Indiana
2008 disestablishments in Indiana
Ice hockey clubs established in 2008
Sports clubs disestablished in 2008
Columbus, Indiana